Andrés Carballo Bustamante (born 29 March 1968) is a Mexican politician affiliated with the Institutional Revolutionary Party. He served as Deputy of the LVIII and LX Legislatures of the Mexican Congress representing Chiapas, and previously served as municipal president of Pichucalco from 1996 to 1998.

References

1968 births
Living people
Institutional Revolutionary Party politicians
Municipal presidents in Chiapas
20th-century Mexican politicians
21st-century Mexican politicians
Politicians from Chiapas
People from Pichucalco
Deputies of the LX Legislature of Mexico
Members of the Chamber of Deputies (Mexico) for Chiapas